Chesterfield Township is one of the twelve townships of Fulton County, Ohio, United States. The 2010 census found 1,012 people in the township.

Geography
Located in the northern part of the county along the Michigan border, it borders the following townships:
Seneca Township, Lenawee County, Michigan - north
Fairfield Township, Lenawee County, Michigan - northeast corner
Royalton Township - east
Pike Township - southeast
Dover Township - south
Franklin Township - southwest corner
Gorham Township - west

The unincorporated communities of Advance, Denson, Inlet and Oakshade are located in Chesterfield Township.

Name and history
Chesterfield Township was organized in 1837, and named for Chesterfield Clemons, a pioneer settler. It is the only Chesterfield Township statewide.

Government
The township is governed by a three-member board of trustees, who are elected in November of odd-numbered years to a four-year term beginning on the following January 1. Two are elected in the year after the presidential election and one is elected in the year before it. There is also an elected township fiscal officer, who serves a four-year term beginning on April 1 of the year after the election, which is held in November of the year before the presidential election. Vacancies in the fiscal officership or on the board of trustees are filled by the remaining trustees.

Attractions
The Tiffin River runs through the northwest portion of the township.

The Advance area features a private  campground with 800 campsites and a small golf course.

Public services

Public schools

Students from the township are served by the following public local school district:
 
 Evergreen Local School District

Mail

Mail is delivered in the township by the following U.S. Post Office locations:

 Fayette, Ohio 43521
 Lyons, Ohio 43533
 Wauseon, Ohio 43567

Telephone

Most of the township is within the Chesterfield telephone exchange, which is served by Windstream Ohio, with telephone numbers using the following Numbering Plan Code:

 419-452

A northwestern portion is served by the Lyons telephone exchange, which is delivered by UTO (United Telephone Company of Ohio,) doing business as CenturyLink, with the following codes:

 419-390
 419-923

The southern section of the township is within the Wauseon exchange, again served by UTO, DBA CenturyLink:

 419-330
 419-335
 419-337
 419-388
 419-404
 419-583
 419-590

Electric

Toledo Edison and Midwest Energy Cooperative serve the township with electricity.

Highways

Fire and EMS

Morenci Area EMS in Morenci, Michigan serves most of the township, with Lyons Fire/EMS serving an eastern portion, and Wauseon Fire/EMS serving a small area in the south.

References

External links
County website

Townships in Fulton County, Ohio
Townships in Ohio